King of the South may refer to:
 King of the South, a figure mentioned in the Biblical Book of Daniel, Chapter 11 
 Kings of the South, a 2005 a collaborative mixtape by American rappers Lil' Flip and Z-Ro
 T.I., an American rap artist
 Yung6ix, a Nigerian rapper

See also
 List of honorific titles in popular music